Tomás Spinelli (born 16 November 1993) is an Argentine footballer who plays for Patronato.

References

Argentine footballers
1993 births
Living people
Club Atlético Patronato footballers
Argentine Primera División players
Association football midfielders
People from Concordia, Entre Ríos
Sportspeople from Entre Ríos Province